Thomas Donoghue is a Gaelic footballer who plays for Naomh Conaill and also, formerly, for the Donegal county team.

Donoghue was a member of the Naomh Conaill side that won their first ever Donegal Senior Football Championship in 2005. He added another in 2010.

With Donegal he won the 2007 National Football League. He came on as a substitute in the final against Mayo. He had been named to start the final but Paddy McConigley was a late replacement for him.

References

External links
 Thomas Donoghue at gaainfo.com

Year of birth missing (living people)
Living people
Donegal inter-county Gaelic footballers
Naomh Conaill Gaelic footballers